Joshua Eugene Richardson Munzon (born January 22, 1995) is a Filipino-American professional basketball player for the NorthPort Batang Pier of the Philippine Basketball Association (PBA).

Early life and collegiate career 
Joshua Eugene Munzon was born on January 15, 1995, in Long Beach, California with his father being Filipino. For his collegiate education, Munzon attended and graduated from the California State University in Los Angeles Prior to committing to the 3x3 variant of basketball, Munzon played competitive 5-a-side basketball. In college, he played for the Cal State LA Golden Eagles in the NCAA Division II.

Professional career

Saigon Heat (2016–2017) 
In 2016 shortly after graduating from college, he moved to Vietnam to join the Saigon Heat of the ASEAN Basketball League (ABL) to start his professional basketball career. He played in the ABL as a "heritage player" for non-Philippine teams owing to his Filipino lineage. He was part of Saigon Heat until January 2017.

Westports Malaysia Dragons (2017–2018) 
Shortly after playing for Heat, he joined the Westports Malaysia Dragons in February 2017 and was part of the team for the rest of 2016–17 ABL season. After the season, Munzon and Westport could not agree on a contract and Muzon sought to play for another ABL team. However the Malaysian team did not agree to release him to play for another ABL team due to what Munzon claims to be a result of a "gentlemen's agreement" that players will have to wait for a year before playing for another team.

For the meantime, Munzon suited up for PEA in the Thailand Basketball League in 2017. Munzon returned to the ABL rejoined the Westports Malaysia Dragons in late December 2017.

iECO Green Warriors (2018)
In 2018, Munzon had a brief stint with the iECO Green Warriors, a PBA Developmental League selection team, which played in Asia League's The Terrific 12 tournament in Macau.

FIBA 3x3 Pro Circuit and Chooks-to-Go Pilipinas 3x3 (2019) 
Munzon has played in the FIBA 3x3 World Tour. For the 2019 iteration, he played for Pasig Chooks.

In the domestic scene, Munzon plays in the Chooks-to-Go Pilipinas 3x3 league. It was in late 2018, that the proponents of the league reached out to Munzon to play 3x3. His participation in the 2019 season helped in boosting the Philippines FIBA 3x3 Federation ranking that qualified the country's national team's participation in the 2020 Summer Olympics qualifiers. In the process, Munzon became part of the Top 100 of the individual FIBA 3x3 rankings at rank 89th and became the top-ranked Filipino player by June 2019.

Terrafirma Dyip (2021–2022) 
On March 14, 2021, Munzon was selected first overall by the Terrafirma Dyip in the PBA Season 46 draft.

NorthPort Batang Pier (2023–present)
On January 12, 2023, Munzon was traded to the NorthPort Batang Pier for Kevin Ferrer.

PBA career statistics

As of the end of 2022–23 season

Season-by-season averages

|-
| align=left | 
| align=left | Terrafirma
| 9 || 30.5 || .403 || .242 || .758 || 3.4 || 2.6 || 1.3 || .2 || 16.6
|-
| align=left rowspan=2| 
| align=left | Terrafirma
| rowspan=2|33 || rowspan=2|25.4 || rowspan=2|.323 || rowspan=2|.240 || rowspan=2|.641 || rowspan=2|3.2 || rowspan=2|1.9 || rowspan=2|1.0 || rowspan=2|.3 || rowspan=2|9.8
|-
| align=left | NorthPort
|-class=sortbottom
| align="center" colspan=2 | Career
| 42 || 26.5 || .345 || .240 || .676 || 3.3 || 2.0 || 1.1 || .2 || 11.3

National team career 
Munzon is only eligible to play for the Philippine national basketball team as a "naturalized" player despite his Filipino heritage through his father since he acquired a Philippine passport after turning age 16 as per FIBA eligibility rules. He instead represents the country through its national 3x3 team.

Notes

References

External links 
 Joshua Munzon at FIBA 3X3

1995 births
Living people
American sportspeople of Filipino descent
ASEAN Basketball League players
Basketball players from Long Beach, California
Cal State Los Angeles Golden Eagles men's basketball players
Citizens of the Philippines through descent
FIBA 3x3 World Tour players
Filipino expatriate basketball people in Malaysia
Filipino expatriate basketball people in Thailand
Filipino expatriate basketball people in Vietnam
Filipino men's 3x3 basketball players
Kuala Lumpur Dragons players
NorthPort Batang Pier players
Philippines national 3x3 basketball team players
Saigon Heat players
Shooting guards
Small forwards
Terrafirma Dyip draft picks
Terrafirma Dyip players